Battle of Kosovo is a 1989 Yugoslav historical drama/war film filmed in Serbia. The film was based on the drama written by poet Ljubomir Simović. It depicts the historical Battle of Kosovo between Medieval Serbia and the Ottoman Empire which took place on 15 June 1389 (according to the Julian calendar, 28 June 1389 by the Gregorian calendar) in a field about 5 kilometers northwest of Pristina.

Serbian Duke Lazar in 1389 refuses to obey the Turk Sultan Murat who intends on invading Serbia with an army in order to conquer Europe. Although aware that he is weaker, without enough men, Duke Lazar decides to fight him anyway. The Serbian Lords are not united. Most of them want to fight, even at the cost of defeat, but some of them do not. Everyone fit for battle is sent to Kosovo. The battle of Kosovo in 1389 ended with no winners - with both armies defeated and both Lazar and Murat dead. The Turks would proceed to invade Serbia but were hindered from taking over the rest of Europe.

The film was released in 1989, which marked the 600th anniversary of the Battle.

Cast
 Miloš Žutić as Prince Lazar Hrebeljanović
 Gorica Popović as Princess Milica
 Vojislav Brajović as Vuk Branković
 Žarko Laušević as Miloš Obilić
 Ljuba Tadić as Sultan Murad
 Branislav Lečić as Bayezid
 Katarina Gojković as the Kosovo Maiden
 Neda Arnerić as the Fishwife
 Tihomir Lazić as Lazar Musić
 Marko Baćović as Yakub Bey
 Ivan Bekjarev as Paramunian
 Branko Cvejić as Levčanian
 Svetozar Cvetković as Milan Toplica
 Milena Dravić as Velisava
 Milan Gutović as Ivan Kosančić
 Dušan Janjićijević as Miralem
 Rastislav Jović as Milutin the Servant
 Milutin Karadžić as The guard
 Petar Kralj as Vojiša
 Predrag Laković as Teofan
 Toni Laurenčić as Stefan Musić
 Irfan Mensur as Makarije
 Radoslav Milenković as Bogoje
 Predrag Milinković as The salooner
 Miodrag Radovanović as Spiridon
 Nemanja Stanišić as Stefan Lazarević
 Tanasije Uzunović as Gerasim
 Bata Živojinović as Hamza the Serb
 Suzana Petričević as Andja
 Dragomir Čumić
 Josif Tatić

See also
 Yugoslav films
 Serbian films

External links
 

1989 films
1980s Serbian-language films
Serbian war drama films
Yugoslav war drama films
Films set in the 14th century
Films set in Kosovo
Films set in Serbia
Kosovo (film)
1980s war drama films
Biographical films about Serbian royalty
1989 crime drama films
Cultural depictions of Serbian monarchs
Films shot in Serbia